Ignác Molnár (born 1 October 1901 – 9 March 1986), also spelled Ignáce Molnár, was a Hungarian footballer and football manager.

A journeyman manager, Molnár managed teams in the Netherlands, Belgium, Italy, Turkey, Israel and Austria. Molnár is best known for his three stints with Fenerbahçe, especially the 1967–1968 season wherein he helped the team win 5 trophies.

Managerial career
Molnár had a brief career as a footballer, playing in Hungary and Italy.

Molnár begun his managerial career with various teams in the Netherlands. He was so well liked by his players at Royal Antwerp F.C., that 7 members of the team left when Molnár was fired. Molnár moved to Torino in Italy to replace the Jewish-Hungarian Ernest Erbstein who has facing racial discrimination – his tenure ended at the start of World War II.

After the World War, Molnár managed Fenerbahçe and won the 1947–48 Istanbul Football League. Molnár then had two spells coaching the Turkey national football team and coached them during 1948 Summer Olympics. Molnár returned to Fenerbahçe again almost 10 years later, winning the inaugural Turkish National League in 1959. Molnár moved to Israel in 1960 with Hapoel Petah Tikva F.C. in the Liga Leumit (then the premier Israeli division), and won his debut season with one of the most dominant teams in Israeli history. Molnár returned to Fenerbahçe, and in his first season back won almost every competition the team participated in; the Turkish National League, Turkish Cup, Spor Toto Cup, and Balkans Cup were amongst the trophies won.

Honours

Managerial
Fenerbahçe
 Istanbul Football League: 1947–1948
 Turkish National League: 1958–1959, 1967–1968
 Turkish Cup: 1967–1968
 Turkish Super Cup: 1967–1968
 Spor Toto Cup: 1967
 Balkans Cup: 1966–1967

Hapoel Petah Tikva
 Liga Leumit: 1960–1961

References

External links
Mackolik Profile
Spor.De Profile

1901 births
1986 deaths
Footballers from Budapest
Hungarian footballers
Association football forwards
L.R. Vicenza players
A.S. Roma players
Serie B players
Hungarian expatriate footballers
Hungarian expatriate sportspeople in Italy
Expatriate footballers in Italy
Hungarian football managers
Willem II (football club) managers
Royal Antwerp F.C. managers
Torino F.C. managers
Fenerbahçe football managers
Maccabi Tel Aviv F.C. managers
FC Red Bull Salzburg managers
Vefa S.K. managers
Adanaspor managers
Turkey national football team managers
Eredivisie managers
Belgian Pro League managers
Süper Lig managers
Serie B managers
Serie A managers
Austrian Football Bundesliga managers
Hungarian expatriate football managers
Hungarian expatriate sportspeople in the Netherlands
Hungarian expatriate sportspeople in Belgium
Hungarian expatriate sportspeople in Turkey
Hungarian expatriate sportspeople in Israel
Hungarian expatriate sportspeople in Austria
Expatriate football managers in the Netherlands
Expatriate football managers in Belgium
Expatriate football managers in Italy
Expatriate football managers in Turkey
Expatriate football managers in Israel
Expatriate football managers in Austria